Count Ian Melcher Shering Wachtmeister af Johannishus (24 December 1932 – 11 November 2017) was a Swedish industrialist and politician. He was a member of the Swedish Riksdag from 1991 to 1994. He was the son of Count Ted Wachtmeister and Adrienne, née De Geer.

Biography
Wachtmeister was born on the family estate Nääs outside Nyköping in Södermanland County on 24 December 1932. Wachtmeister studied mining and metallurgy at the Royal Institute of Technology in Stockholm and graduated in 1957. He then embarked on a successful industrial career culminating in CEO posts at Oxelösunds Järnverks AB 1970-1978 and Gränges Aluminium AB 1978-1983.

Together with record company owner Bert Karlsson he founded the populist political party New Democracy, and as party leader achieved parliamentary representation in the 1991 general election from Örebro County. The party's criticism of the Swedish immigration politics generated accusations of racism. Wachtmeister left the party in April 1994.

Prior to the election in 1998, Wachtmeister organised the short lived and unsuccessful Det nya partiet (The New Party). Thereafter he focused on managing his business interests, in particular the company The Empire.

In 2010 he was associated with the political party Sweden Democrats as a "general advisor" to their leader Jimmie Åkesson. When asked in 2009 he expressed his intention to vote for the Liberal People's Party in the 2010 Swedish general election.

He died of cancer on 11 November 2017.

Bibliography

 Ankdammen (1988)
 Elefanterna (1990)
 Krokodilerna (1992)
 Grodorna (2000)
 Rebellerna : en historiebok (2009)
 Sotarna (2014)

Ancestry

References

1932 births
2017 deaths
Deaths from cancer in Sweden
Members of the Riksdag 1991–1994
Swedish people of German descent
Swedish counts
Swedish nobility
Swedish businesspeople
Swedish engineers
New Democracy (Sweden) politicians
Ian
Political party founders